The Saint Anne Parish of Upper Watertown  is a Roman Catholic parish church located in the Várkerület district (Buda Castle district), Budapest. The Saint Anne Parish Church of Upper Watertown, often used by its short name, St. Anne's Church, is one of the most significant buildings of the Batthyány tér. Its construction was started in 1740 according to the plans of master builder Kristóf Hamon, and after his death, Máté Nöpauer completed the building in 1761.

History 
The parish was founded in 1390 but was destroyed in 1540 by the Turks during the Ottoman Hungary. It was re-established in 1687 by Archbishop, György Széchenyi and the birth of the registrar began in 1693. Count Wenzel Sinzendorf built a two-story house on the foundation walls of the destroyed parish in 1626, which was bought in 1720 by the timber merchant Matthias Forstmayer and opened a pub in it. In 1724, the City Council of Buda bought it along with the land and converted the house into a chapel and a parish with the bricklayer John Fiedler, a mason whose ministry was performed by the Jesuits.

The construction of the Church of St. Anne 
Design and construction management was entrusted to Kristóf Hamon. The shrine, which was used temporarily as a church, was completed in 1746. In 1748, Hamon died, and the building of the former palace, later the widow's husband, Máté Nöpauer native to Brno, continued the construction of the church. It was completed in 1761. The damage caused by the earthquake of 1763 was repaired by Adam Kögl SJ and János Hamon, the son of the builder Kristóf Hamon. At the same time, he provided the rich facade ornamentation. In 1773 the church was neglected due to the dissolution of the order and the frequent change of parish. In August 4th, the church was consecrated again. In 1950, due to an excavation work during the construction of the underground metro network, the church was threatened to be demolished, but in 1954 the plan was abandoned.

The church
The 21.5-meter-wide and 55-meter-high two-tower facade faces north from the eastern side of the parish house. In the plane of the main facade, the main gate with a basket arch is decorated with statues of Faith, Hope and Love, and above it is a large chronicle window adorned with the choir. In the booth on the second floor, Saint Anne presenting Mary, above the coat of arms of the city of Buda in tympanum, is shone by God's eye among the worshiping angels. An oval dome covers the octagonal space of the church nave, joining from the north a foyer below the loft surrounded by the towers and from the south a shrine with a triumphal arch, the Trinity fresco by Gergely Vogl, the painting of the dome Altar of the Eucharist by Béla Kontuly and Pál Molnár C. was painted in 1938. The oval dome space is made of composite pilasters lined with four spiral staircases behind its eastern and western corners. In the south are the oratories and in the north the pipe organ. A large group of statues can be seen in the building of the altarpiece, symbolizing the Great Church in Jerusalem: Saint Anne, Joachim, priest Zacharias, Elizabeth and King David presenting the child Mary in the church. The group of statues were made between 1771 and 1773 by its creator Károly Bebo, who also carved the pulpit. In 1767-68 he created the side altars and Holy Cross and Saint Francis Xavier were made by Antal Eberhard, he also created the Eye of God, the main facade with statues of angels and the coat of arms of the city of Buda sculpted. The Loretto Chapel is a richly laid, flat, symmetrical closing wrought iron barrier wall dating back to 1752 by Ignác Pugl. The work of the carved secretary cabinet by Antal Feldmayer. The other high altar by István Bagi.

It has three bells, and the left tower is empty of bells.

Gallery

See also
 List of Jesuit sites

References

External links

Várkerület
Roman Catholic churches in Budapest
Roman Catholic churches completed in 1761
Baroque architecture in Hungary
18th-century Roman Catholic church buildings in Hungary